Maike Schirmer  (born 25 May 1990) is a German handball player for VfL Oldenburg and the German national team.

She was selected as part of the German team for the 2017 World Women's Handball Championship.

References

External links

1990 births
Living people
People from Segeberg
German female handball players 
Sportspeople from Schleswig-Holstein
21st-century German women